Dorothy Liggett Pelanda (born March 1, 1956) is an American lawyer and former Director of the Ohio Department of Agriculture.

Personal
Pelanda is married to Sam Gerhardstein, retired Governmental Affairs Director for Columbia Gas of Ohio. She has three children: Brian Pelanda, Doug Pelanda and Zoe Pelanda.

Career
After graduating from the University of Akron School of Law, Pelanda returned to Marysville, Ohio where she began a career in law.  She has 30 years experience in the legal profession in private practice specializing in family law.  After her appointment to the Ohio House, Pelanda opted to devote her full energies to her legislative duties, and she closed her law office in late 2011.

Prior to her appointment to the Ohio House, Pelanda served two terms as president of both the Marysville Library Board and U-CO Industries in Union County.  Pelanda established the Criminal Indigents of Union County in 2005, before the Union County Criminal Defense Lawyers assumed the work of representing indigent persons charged with felonies.

Ohio House of Representatives
When Senator Karen Gillmor was appointed to the Industrial Commission of Ohio, it set off a chain of legislative appointments which saw Representative David Burke receive an appointment to the Ohio Senate to finish out Gillmor's term. Pelanda was appointed to finish Burke's unexpired term. Pelanda then opted to seek election to Burke's former seat in the Ohio House.

Pelanda ultimately was elected to succeed Burke.  She was seated on July 28, 2011. During her House service from 2011 through 2018, Pelanda served on the following House committees: Agriculture, Commerce and Labor, Government Accountability and Oversight, Criminal Justice, Judiciary, and Rules and Reference.

Pelanda was elected to her second full term in 2014, and her third full term in 2016. During her service in the House, Pelanda was elected by her peers to serve as House Majority Whip, and later as House Majority Floor Leader, the third-ranking leadership position in the House.

In March 2017, Pelanda announced her candidacy for Ohio Secretary of State. Her campaign ended in October 2017.

Ohio Department of Agriculture
On January 10, 2019, Gov. Mike DeWine announced that he was nominating Pelanda as Director of the Ohio Department of Agriculture. The nomination is subject to Senate confirmation. On January 14, 2019, Pelanda was sworn in as the first female Director of the Ohio Department of Agriculture.

References

1956 births
Living people
People from Marysville, Ohio
Republican Party members of the Ohio House of Representatives
Ohio lawyers
Miami University alumni
University of Akron alumni
21st-century American politicians
Women state legislators in Ohio
21st-century American women politicians